Fairview is a neighbourhood on the west side of the city of Vancouver, British Columbia, Canada. It runs from False Creek in the north to 16th Avenue in the south, and from Burrard Street in the west to Cambie Street in the east.

Central Broadway is an important commercial and employment centre focused around Vancouver General Hospital and other health-related institutions, including the BC Cancer Agency, BC Cancer Research Centre, BC Healthy Living Alliance, and the BC Centre for Disease Control. Other shopping areas in the neighbourhood are South Granville Rise, City Square Shopping Centre, and Granville Island.

Some city offices are located on the eastern fringe of Fairview, across Cambie Street from Vancouver City Hall.

Education

Fairview is served by Kitsilano Secondary School and Eric Hamber Secondary School, as well as L'École Bilingue, Emily Carr Elementary School, Edith Cavell Elementary School, False Creek Elementary School, Henry Hudson Elementary School, Shaughnessy Elementary School, and Trafalgar Elementary School, although only False Creek and L'École Bilingue are physically located in the neighbourhood. The private schools Madrona School and Blessed Sacrament School also find their home in the neighbourhood.

History

The Fairview area, like nearly all of what is now the city of Vancouver, was a primeval rain forest rich with wildlife and gigantic timber  until the opening of the Moodyville and Hastings Mills on Burrard Inlet in the 1860s and was one of the first areas to be logged.  The area was one of the CPR land grants within the city but remained largely undeveloped until the city's expansion outside the Burrard Peninsula with the construction of the city's new electric railway system in the 1890s.  Among the city's lines, which included the Cambie and Granville streetcars and the crosstown route along Broadway, a line known as the Fairview Loop ran in both directions from downtown up Main to Broadway to Granville and back into downtown.  With that area's ease of access to the city core, commercial and residential development quickly filled out the neighbourhood, which north of Broadway enjoys a fine view of the city core and the North Shore Mountains, hence the name.

Demographics
As of 2016, Fairview has 33,620 people. 9.6% of the population is under the age of 20; 40.0% is between 20 and 39; 32.8% is between 40 and 64; and 17.5% is 65 or older. 70.9% of Fairview residents speak English as a first language, and 7.7% speak a Chinese language. The median household income is $69,337 and 14.7% of its population lives in low-income households. The unemployment rate is 4.6%.

Notes

References

Neighbourhoods in Vancouver